Galbenu River may refer to the following rivers in Romania:

 Galbenu, a tributary of the Latorița in Vâlcea County
 Galbenu, a tributary of the Lotrișor in Vâlcea County
 Galbenu, a tributary of the Vâja in Gorj County

See also 
 Galbena River (disambiguation)